Gangai Amaran is an Indian music composer, singer, lyricist, writer, film director and actor in Tamil films.

Personal life
Gangai Amaran was born in Pannaipuram in Theni district, Tamil Nadu in December 1947, as the youngest son of Daniel Ramaswamy and Chinnathayi. He is the younger brother of noted music director Ilaiyaraaja and father of director and actor Venkat Prabhu and actor, composer and singer Premji Amaren. He had two more elder brothers, R. D. Bhaskar and Pavalar Varadharajan, both who died long back. Composers Karthik Raja, Yuvan Shankar Raja, singer Bhavatharini and costume designer Vasuki Bhaskar are his relations.

Regarding his name, Gangai was taken from a magazine of same name which he read during childhood while Amaran is derived from a pseudonym Amar Singh which he wanted to adopt himself when he aimed to be a lyricist. His latest interview with Chithra Lakshmanan in Touring talkies YouTube channel he has shared his life experiences and about his career struggle and also about his personal differences with his elder brother Ilayaraja where he mentioned about many controversial issues with him in his career.

Career

Films
Amaran revealed his debut film as composer Malargalile Oru Malligai starring Malaysia Vasudevan became unreleased despite soundtrack being released so Oru Vidukathai Oru Thodarkathai became his first film as composer to be released. Along with his brother Ilaiyaraja, Gangai Amaran started his career as a composer and composed for many successful films such as Mouna Geethangal and Vazhvey Maayam (1983). Apart from composing, Amaran made his directorial debut with Kozhi Koovuthu (1982) and went on to direct many films including highly successful Karagattakaran (1989). Themmangu Paattukaran was his last film as a director while Poonjolai which would have been the acting debut of his son Venkat Prabhu remains unreleased. Now he is working with Clusters media college.

Politics
Gangai Amaran also took plunge in politics by joining BJP and also contested in RK Nagar constituency. Apart from that, he also served as a member of Central Board of Film Certification.

Filmography

Writer/Director

Music Director

Singer

Lyricist(Partial Filmography)

Dubbing artist 

 K. Bhagyaraj - Puthiya Vaarpugal (1979), Bhama Rukmani (1980)

Onscreen appearances
Karagattakaran (1989)
Ooru Vittu Ooru Vandhu (1990)
Idhayam (1991)
Chinnavar (1992)
Unnidathil Ennai Koduthen (1998)
Jodi (1999)
Kandukondain Kandukondain (2000)
Ullam Kollai Poguthey (2001)
Chennai 600028 II: Second Innings(2016)
Arya Surya (2013)
Yaanai (2022)

References

External links

Gangai Amaran as Music Director
Gangai Amaran as Lyricist
Gangai Amaran as Singer

Indian Tamil people
Tamil musicians
Tamil film score composers
Kannada film score composers
Living people
Indian male songwriters
Tamil film poets
1947 births
Musicians from Tamil Nadu
People from Theni district
Film directors from Tamil Nadu
Tamil film directors
Indian lyricists
20th-century Indian film directors
Male film score composers
Tamil-language lyricists